Saint Quentin Church (in French église Saint-Quentin) is a small 12th-century fortified church in Scy-Chazelles, in the suburbs of Metz (Lorraine, France). It is the burial place of Robert Schuman,  one of the founders of the European Union.

Photos

References
 Translate from   Église Saint-Quentin de Scy-Chazelles

Fortified church buildings in France
Roman Catholic churches in Metz